Kotda Bujurg is a village in Mandsaur, Madhya Pradesh, India. It is situated between several masses of mountains.

Villages in Mandsaur district